Events in the year 2023 in Mauritius.

Incumbents 

 President: Prithvirajsing Roopun
 Prime Minister: Pravind Jugnauth

Events

References 

 
2020s in Mauritius
Years of the 21st century in Mauritius
Mauritius
Mauritius